Elizabeth Gyring (1886–1970) was an American composer born in Vienna, Austria, the daughter of laryngologist Leopold Rethy. She studied with Joseph Marx and Ludwig Gzaczkes at the Vienna Academy of Music and had successful premieres as a composer in Berlin and Vienna. She married Otto Geiringer, and in 1939 the couple emigrated to the United States where Gyring became a citizen. She died in New York City in 1970, and her papers are housed at Washington State University.

Works 
Gyring composed choral and orchestra works, chamber music, organ and works for solo instruments. Selected works include:
The reign of violence is over (Text: Henry Wadsworth Longfellow)
Piano Sonata No.2 (1957)
Hymn of Gratitude (1948)
Arabesque for bassoon

Her works have been recorded and issued on CD, including:
Harrison/ Perry/ Gyring (2010)

References 

1886 births
1970 deaths
20th-century classical composers
American women classical composers
American classical composers
Austrian classical composers
Austrian emigrants to the United States
Austrian women composers
Musicians from Vienna
Pupils of Joseph Marx
20th-century American women musicians
20th-century American composers
20th-century women composers